Burnwell is an unincorporated community in Walker County, Alabama, United States, located on the southern border of Dora. Burnwell had a post office from May 21, 1910, to December 30, 2010; it still has its own ZIP code, 35038.

References

Unincorporated communities in Walker County, Alabama
Unincorporated communities in Alabama